Marco Antonio Marroquín Tierrablanca (born June 14, 1977, in Mexico City) is a Mexican football manager and former player.

References

1977 births
Living people
Mexican footballers
Association football defenders
Lagartos de Tabasco footballers
Club Tijuana footballers
Ascenso MX players
Mexican football managers
Footballers from Mexico City